Wat Aranyawiwake (Thai script: วัดอรัญญวิเวก, RTGS: Wat Aranyawiwek) is a monastery (wat) in the Thai Forest Tradition of the Theravada lineage of Buddhism. It is in Mae Taeng, Chiang Mai Province, northern Thailand. Phra Ajahn Plien Panyapatipo is the current abbot of Wat Aranyawiwake, where he has resided since 1966. Wat Aranyawiwake was established and named by Luang Pho Mun Bhuridatta, the "father" of the current tradition of forest meditation monastics.

The monastery
Wat Aranyawiwake was originally an old monastic residence, established by a group of people from various families in Intakhin Sub-district, Mae Taeng District, Chiang Mai Province. They had deep interest and faith in Buddhism.

They invited virtuous monks, who were meditation masters, to reside in the village in order for them to hear the teaching of the Buddha. Later on, they heard of a monk who practiced meditation and stopped by a wat in Mae Taeng District, so they invited the Venerable Ajahn Mun Bhuridatta. Ajahn Mun accepted the invitation and gathered a group of disciples, to seek an appropriate place for practice of meditation. They searched for four days and Ajahn Mun found this place.

At the end of the rain retreat, Ajahn Mun and his disciples left the place to continue their austere practice. Ajahn Mun told his followers, who attended him in Ban Pong, that he had named this place "Aranyawiwake monastic residence".

See also
 Thai Forest Tradition
 Ajahn Mun Bhuridatta
 Luang Por Waen Sujinno
 Rain retreat

Further reading
 What Buddha taught website

External links
 Receive 2009 New Year Blessing from Luang Por Plien Panyapatipo

Buddhist temples and monasteries of the Thai Forest Tradition
Buddhist temples in Chiang Mai province